The Films of Rick Dalton is an upcoming novel written by Quentin Tarantino. It details the life and film and television career of the fictional actor Rick Dalton. Dalton is the main protagonist in Tarantino's 2019 film Once Upon a Time in Hollywood and 2021 novelization. In the film he is portrayed by Leonardo DiCaprio. Tarantino has already completed the novel and plans to publish it as his third book.

Character biography and background

Originally from the Midwest, Rick Dalton is an actor who moved to Los Angeles and starred in the fictitious television Western series Bounty Law from 1959 to 1963, inspired by real-life series Wanted Dead or Alive, starring Steve McQueen. Dalton's career was parallel to McQueen's for a couple of years. His series ran on NBC at the same time McQueen's ran on CBS. However, after McQueen starred in The Magnificent Seven their career paths took two very different trajectories. After Bounty Law Dalton began to appear in supporting film roles, leading to a four-picture-contract with Universal Pictures, ending in 1967. His film career never took off and in '67 he started to guest star on TV series as villains. While preparing to film his role in the 1966 movie The 14 Fists of McClusky Dalton would practice by using a flamethrower for three hours a day for two weeks.

In February 1969 Dalton has no understanding of New Hollywood or the hippie generation and sees himself as not belonging. He guest stars on the TV western Lancer where he is challenged as an actor for the first time by both child actor Trudi Frazer and director Sam Wanamaker. Through this challenge Dalton is able to see a future for himself in the new generation of filmmaking. Tarantino said of Dalton, "his biggest enemy is himself... his bad guys are his own demons," and likens Dalton finally facing his demons on Lancer to The Wild Bunch facing the Mexican Army.

Dalton's relationship with his stunt double and best friend Cliff Booth is based on Kurt Russell and his stunt double of many years, John Casino, and Burt Reynolds' with his longtime stunt double Hal Needham. Tarantino's inspiration for Dalton came from actors whose careers began in classical Hollywood but faltered in the 1960s, including Ty Hardin, who went from starring in a successful TV Western to making Spaghetti Westerns, and also Tab Hunter, George Maharis, Vince Edwards, Fabian Forte, William Shatner, and Edd Byrnes, whom Tarantino said DiCaprio responded to the most. In the film Leonardo DiCaprio based his performance on Ralph Meeker. After watching numerous performances on television and film, DiCaprio really connected with Meeker. He decided that was the guy closest to Dalton, stating "That was the soul of who Rick Dalton was for me." Dalton suffers from alcoholism and an undiagnosed bipolar disorder, inspired by Pete Duel.

After creating the character of Dalton for the film Once Upon a Time in Hollywood, Tarantino collaborated with DiCaprio to fully develop and craft the character. What attracted DiCaprio to Dalton was that he, along with Booth were telling a Hollywood story as outsiders. DiCaprio saw them as the Jay Gatsby and Nick Carraway of Hollywood. They watch Sharon Tate's house as Gatsby and Carraway look at Daisy Buchanan's. DiCaprio described Tate's house as "this crystal castle next door... and they don't belong to it... That's the Hollywood they want to belong to, or at least Rick is desperately hoping to be a part of." DiCaprio and Tarantino studied the performances of Byrnes, Hardin, Meeker and others to find Dalton's identity. DiCaprio also really connected with Dalton's relationships with Trudi Frazer (who he saw as a young Meryl Streep) and Booth. To him Dalton was a template for Hollywood at the time, and for actor's self doubt which he related to on a personal level. Dalton has a stutter which DiCaprio based on a friend of his. He stated that it comes out when his friend is nervous and uncertain about his life. DiCaprio felt that it would help to represent Dalton's nervousness and anxiety.

Not included the film or its novelization, before shooting Spaghetti Westerns in Italy, Dalton's agent Marvin Schwarz arranges for him to have dinner with Sergio Corbucci and his wife, costume designer Nori Bonicelli, during which Dalton confuses Corbucci with Sergio Leone and disparages the English-dubbed version of Navajo Joe. Despite showing little respect or understanding for the genre and the Italian film industry, Dalton agrees to work with Corbucci because he believes he will suit the Nebraska Jim role well. Although Dalton comes to respect Corbucci's methods, his frequent outbursts over the Italian crew's methods of making the film, such as the use of multilingual actors speaking their own language (whose dialogue would later be replaced through dubbing), prompts Corbucci to turn down Dalton's offer to play Hud Dixon in The Specialists in favor of Johnny Hallyday.

Tarantino revealed that Dalton finds more success after the events of the film. His killing of Manson Family member Susan "Sadie" Atkins with a flamethrower from his film The 14 Fists of McClusky attracts much of the media's attention, leading to offers for roles in feature films. He also gets bigger guest roles in TV series, including an episode of Mission: Impossible centered around his character.

After Dalton stars in the early 1980s film The Fireman he becomes a straight-to-video action star. He travels to Italy and the Philippines shooting B movie versions of top action films for Cannon Films and goes on to make two sequels to The Fireman. He continues to guest star on television shows but he is in high demand and earns top rate for his appearances. In 1988, Dalton retires from acting and moves to Hawaii with his wife Francesca Capucci, eventually meeting Tarantino himself at the 1996 Hawaii International Film Festival.

Ralph Meeker 
Meeker, the actor DiCaprio tapped into the most for his portrayal, served as an influence for a previous Tarantino character. Tarantino's vision for Butch Coolidge (Bruce Willis)'s demeanor in Pulp Fiction was that of Meeker's portrayal of Mike Hammer in Robert Aldrich's Kiss Me Deadly.

Novel background
In July 2021, Tarantino revealed that he had written most of a career book, recounting the filmography of Rick Dalton as if he had actually existed. It would include synopses, critical quotes from the time, and recounting of his film and television career until 1988. It details every one of Dalton's appearances on film and episodic television, with most of them being real programs and films with Dalton replacing the actual actor who starred in the project. However some of the films and shows are completely fictional.

One of the fictional films is the vigilante movie The Fireman: 

By December 2021, Tarantino expected the book to be released following his film criticism book titled Cinema Speculation. Tarantino also added that within his Once Upon a Time universe a fictionalized version of himself writes the book after meeting Dalton and Roger Ebert and curating a Rick Dalton film retrospective.

Partial fictional filmography

This is an incomplete filmography of Dalton. All information in the filmography can be found in the following sources unless otherwise cited within the filmography.

Television
Tales of Wells Fargo (1957) — episode: Jesse James — Jesse James (portrayed by Hugh Beaumont in real-life)
Whirlybirds (year unknown) — Guest role (episode directed by Bud Springsteen)
Big Sky Country (1958) — episode: Pilot — Oldest son (The series was never picked up) (co-starring Frank Lovejoy as the series lead, a widowed sheriff. Produced by Four Star Productions.)
Bounty Law (TV series) (1959–1963) — Jake Cahill (Lead role: 48 episodes) (directors: Paul Wendkos) [producers: Robert Fuzz, Lee Donowitz (for Donowitz see Coming Home In a Body Bag below)]
Riverboat (year unknown) — Guest role (co-starred Burt Reynolds, directed by William Witney)
Hullabaloo (1965) — Guest Star, Himself (Dalton appeared to promote his film Tanner. Musical guests: The Kinks, who also appeared on a real-life episode in 1965 which featured Frankie Avalon and Annette Funicello as hosts. The clip in Once Upon a Time in Hollywood most closely resembles an episode from 1966 hosted by George Maharis.)
Tarzan (1967) — episode: Jewel of the Jungle — Brick Bedford
The Green Hornet (1967) — episode: Hornet Hunter — Thompson Shaw. The episode most closely resembles the real life episode Invasion from Outer Space. Gary Kent served as the stunt coordinator on the episode. Kent was married to stunt woman Tomi Barrett. 
Bingo Martin (1967) — episode: Heck to Pay — Rocky Ryan
Land of the Giants (1968) — episode: Capture — Dr. David Hellstrom
The F.B.I. (1969) — episode: All The Streets Are Silent — Michael Murtaugh (portrayed by Burt Reynolds in real-life episode)
Lancer (1969) — episode: Pilot — Caleb DeCoteau. Inspired by the real-life pilot The High Riders. 
Matt Lincoln (1970) — Guest role
[[Mission: Impossible (1966 TV series)|Mission: Impossible]] (early 1970s) — Guest villainCade's County (1971) — Guest roleBanacek (early 1970s) — Guest role

 Real films 
Although these films are real, any information including Rick Dalton and Cliff Booth is fictional.Battle of the Coral Sea (1959) — small role (loosely based on Cliff Booth's escape from a WWII POW camp. The film did not depict how Booth decapitated the Japanese soldiers.)The Chapman Report (1962) — Ed Kraski (portrayed by Ty Hardin in real-life)Cannon for Cordoba (1970) — Jackson Harkness (portrayed by Don Gordon in real-life)The Deadly Trackers (1973) — Role unknownGrizzly (1976) — Don Stober (portrayed by Andrew Prine in real-life)

Additionally Dalton was up for the part of Lover Boy in the 1959 film Gidget. The role ultimately went to Tom Laughlin. He was also reportedly considered for the role of Virgil "The Cooler King" Hilts (Steve McQueen) in John Sturges' The Great Escape.

 Fictional films 

 Drag Race, No Stop 
(year unknown)

Cast

Crew
Director - William Witney
Writer - Richard C. Sarafian

 Comanche Uprising 
(1961)

Cast

Crew

 Big Game 
(1963)

Cast
Rick Dalton - Randy Wilson
Crew
Director - Stewart Granger

 Hellfire, Texas 
(1964) Based on the novel by Nelson and Shirley Wolford. (Based on the real film A Time for Killing)

Cast

Crew

 Tanner 
(1965) loosely based on Gunman's Walk (1958).

Cast

Crew
Director - Jerry Hopper

 Jigsaw Jane 
(year unknown)

Cast

Crew
Producers - Murphy Crawford, Martin H. Poll
Director - David Lowell Rich
Writer - Jerome Zastoupil. (Tarantino's middle name is Jerome and he grew up with the surname Zastoupil, the name of his stepfather.)

 The 14 Fists of McClusky 
(1966) Dalton replaced Fabian Forte who broke his shoulder shortly before shooting. Inspired by Roger Corman's 1964 film The Secret Invasion and Phil Karlson's Hornets' Nest. 14 Fists was filmed in Yugoslavia.

Cast
Rod Taylor - McClusky. Taylor starred in Tarantino's Inglourious Basterds as Winston Churchill. It was his last film. A character named McClusky appears in Tarantino's screenplay of Natural Born Killers. He is a prison warden and head of California state prisons. In Oliver Stone's film adaptation McClusky is played by Tommy Lee Jones and is the deranged, media seeking prison warden of Batongaville State Prison.

Crew
Director - Paul Wendkos

 Salty, The Talking Sea Otter 
(1967)

Cast
Rick Dalton - Jed Martin

 Kill Me Quick, Ringo, Said The Gringo 
(1969)

Cast
Rick Dalton - Ringo. The role was played by Montgomery Wood, Mark Damon, and Ken Clark in real-life Spaghetti Westerns. A character named Ringo appears in Pulp Fiction, portrayed by Tim Roth.

 Nebraska Jim 
(1970) (The 1966 Spaghetti Western film Savage Gringo or Ringo Del Nebraska was released in Germany as Nebraska Jim.)

Cast
Rick Dalton - Nebraska Jim
Daphna Ben-Cobo
Crew
Director - Sergio Corbucci

 Red Blood, Red Skin 
(1970) (Based on the novel The Only Good Indian Is a Dead Indian by Floyd Ray Wilson. Floyd Ray Wilson is the name of the boxer Butch Coolidge kills in the ring in Pulp Fiction.) Inspired by Land Raiders (1970).

Cast
Rick Dalton - Romeo Douglas
Telly Savalas
Carroll Baker

 Hell Boats 
(1970)

Cast
Rick Dalton - Lt. Cmdr. Jeffords
Crew
Director - Paul Wendkos

 Operazione Dyn-O-Mite! 
(1970) (A spaghetti James Bond rip-off-type film. Archive footage from Death on the Run was used in Once Upon a Time in Hollywood for the Operazione Dyn-O-Mite scenes. Also inspired by Secret Agent Super Dragon and Kiss the Girls and Make Them Die.)

Cast
Rick Dalton - Jason (Ty Hardin played the role in Death on the Run. Tarantino saw the character and film as a precursor for Jason Bourne.)
Francesca Capucci
Margaret Lee
Crew
Director - Antonio Margheriti
Stunts - Cliff Booth

 The Fireman 
(early 1980s)

Cast

Crew
Director - Rick Dalton
Action sequences - Cliff Booth
Producers - Rick Dalton, Cliff Booth
Writers - Cliff Booth, Rick Dalton

SequelsThe Fireman 2 (1980s) — lead roleThe Fireman 3 (1980s) — lead role

 Coming Home In a Body Bag 

Sometime in the late 1980s Dalton appeared in the film Coming Home In a Body Bag. The film is originally referred to in the Tarantino penned True Romance. Within the Tarantino universe the film is a well known Vietnam War film, with its title alluding to Hal Ashby's real-life 1978 Vietnam film Coming Home.

Cast
Rick Dalton – Colonel MacDuff
Mickey Burnett – Unknown role. Burnett originally appeared in Tarantino's My Best Friend's Birthday played by Craig Hamann, in which he works at the rockabilly radio station K-Billy. He was named after Sonny Crockett (Don Johnson)'s alter ego, Sonny Burnett from TV series Miami Vice. Mickey later became the name of the Tarantino invented serial killer (Woody Harrelson) in Natural Born Killers.
Luke Griffin
 – Unknown role. O'Neal also starred in the pilot episode of Fox Force Five as the blonde leader with Mia Wallace as Raven McCoy. Wallace is played by Uma Thurman in Pulp Fiction. Somerset is based on Tatum O'Neal and originally appeared in an imitation ABC "After school special" script Tarantino wrote as a child, in which Tarantino also appears. He stated he "fell hopelessly in love" with her after seeing The Bad News Bears. Actress Evan Rachel Wood played O'Neal's character "The Blonde Fox" from Fox Force Five, although said to be inspired by Mia and Thurman's character Beatrix "The Bride" Kiddo from Tarantino's Kill Bill for a 2019 stage musical based on Tarantino's films and featuring music from his films, titled Fox Force Five and the Tyranny of Evil Men. The character was later portrayed by Lindsey Gort in a 2021 version of the play.

Crew
Directed by Anthony Irvin
Written by Freddie White
Music by Michael Kamen
Donowitz appears in True Romance, portrayed by Saul Rubinek and is also a producer of Dalton's Bounty Law. He is the son of Donny Donowitz portrayed by Eli Roth in Tarantino's Inglourious Basterds. Lee is based on film producer Joel Silver. Specifically Silver's mannerisms and demeanor while working on The Last Boy Scout, based on his dealings with director Tony Scott, who also directed True Romance. Author Sharon Willis wrote that Lee Donowitz as a voice of Hollywood was a parody of Oliver Stone and "the voice of film as a commodity in the same universe as drugs." Also, that his betrayal by his protégé Eliot Blitzer (Bronson Pinchot) in True Romance'' is Oedipal in tone. Lee Donowitz was also portrayed by Kevin Pollak in a December 2015 live reading of Tarantino's screenplay presented by Jason Reitman at the Ace Hotel Theater.

References

Hollywood novels
Works by Quentin Tarantino
Upcoming books